Jagdish Narain Sinha (born 1939) is an Indian pharmacologist and a former professor at the Department of Pharmacology and Therapeutics of the Uttar Pradesh Dental College and Research Centre, Lucknow. He is also a former member of the faculty of King George's Medical University and has been a member of the Independent Ethics Committee of the Central Drugs Standard Control Organization.

Born on 15 January 1939, Sinha is known for his researches on the delineation of the neurochemical modulation of medullary baroreflex. His researches have been documented by way of a number of articles and his work has been cited by many researchers. The Council of Scientific and Industrial Research, the apex agency of the Government of India for scientific research, awarded him the Shanti Swarup Bhatnagar Prize for Science and Technology, one of the highest Indian science awards for his contributions to Medical Sciences in 1984.

Selected bibliography

Notes

References

External links 
 

Recipients of the Shanti Swarup Bhatnagar Award in Medical Science
Indian medical writers
1939 births
Indian pharmacologists
Scientists from Uttar Pradesh
Living people